Hajibala Ibrahim oglu Abutalybov (born May 13, 1944) is an Azerbaijani politician. He was Mayor of Baku between 2001 and 2018 and deputy prime minister of Azerbaijan from 2018 to October 2019.   

Abutalybov was born in Kyzyl-Su, Turkmenistan. He graduated from Azerbaijan State University with a degree in Physics in 1965. 
In 1969, he was enrolled in post graduate program at Ioffe Physical-Technical Institute of the Russian Academy of Sciences in Saint Petersburg, Russia. In 1976, he received his PhD and defended his doctoral desertation in 1987.

Abutalybov served as the head of the laboratory at Physics Department of Azerbaijan National Academy of Sciences in 1995.
Same year, he was appointed the Head of the Executive Power of Surakhani district of Baku which he held until 1999. In 2000, he was appointed Deputy Premier of Azerbaijan Republic.

Abutalybov served as Mayor of Baku for 17 years, between January 30, 2001 and 2018. He is married and has two sons.

References

1944 births
People from Türkmenbaşy
Living people
New Azerbaijan Party politicians
Government ministers of Azerbaijan
Mayors of Baku